Kara-Jygach is a village in Osh Region of Kyrgyzstan. It is part of the Kara-Kulja District. Its population was 1,326 in 2021.

References

Populated places in Osh Region